The Journal of Religion and Popular Culture is a triannual online peer-reviewed academic journal that was established in 2002 and is published by University of Toronto Press. The editors-in-chief are Jennifer E. Porter, Associate professor at Memorial University of Newfoundland and David Feltmate, Associate professor at Auburn University at Montgomery. The journal covers the interactions between religion and popular culture.

Abstracting and indexing 
The journal is abstracted and indexed in:
 ATLA Religion Database
 EBSCO databases
 MLA International Bibliography
 ProQuest databases
 Scopus

References

External links 
 

Religious studies journals
Publications established in 2002
Triannual journals
English-language journals
Academic journals published by university presses
University of Toronto